The Intercontinental Rally Challenge was an FIA-sanctioned rallying series organised by SRW Events and Eurosport Events, and aimed to "give new opportunities to young or amateur rally drivers competing in recognised regional and international rallies, while offering organisers an innovative TV format concept, created by Eurosport." The series focused on Group N and Group A spec cars up to 2000 cc, including Super 2000, R4, R2 and R3.

The series began in 2006 under the name International Rally Challenge, adopting the name, Intercontinental Rally Challenge in 2007. The 2012 season was the final season of the series: from 2013, the series promoter Eurosport Events was awarded responsibility for organising the rival European Rally Championship by the FIA, and the two competing series were effectively merged.

Champions

Event winners

See also
List of Intercontinental Rally Challenge rallies

References

External links

Official website

 
Recurring sporting events established in 2006
Recurring sporting events disestablished in 2012